Vayres is a commune in the Haute-Vienne department, New Aquitaine, western France.

Inhabitants are known as Vayrois in French.

See also
Communes of the Haute-Vienne department

References

Communes of Haute-Vienne